Shakir is both a surname and a given name, similar to the surname or name Shakur. Notable people with the name include:
 Ahmad Muhammad Shakir, Egyptian scholar of Hadith (prophetic traditions)
 Faiz Shakir, American Democratic political advisor and campaign manager for Bernie 2020
 Hannah Sabbagh Shakir (1895–1990), Lebanese-American businesswoman and club founder
Khalil Shakir (born 2000), American football player
 M. H. Shakir, a translator of the Qur'an
 Zaid Shakir, American Islamic scholar
 Shakir Ali (artist) (1875–1916), Pakistani artist and teacher
 Shakir Ali (barrister) (1879–1962), Indian lawyer and politician
 Samir Shakir Mahmoud, a member of the Interim Iraq Governing Council
 Mohammed Shakir (Iraqi politician)
 Mohammed Shakir (Indian politician)
 Shakir Mukhamadullin, Russian ice hockey player

See also
Shakur

Arabic-language surnames
Arabic masculine given names